These are the results of the women's balance beam competition, one of six events for female competitors in artistic gymnastics at the 1992 Summer Olympics in Barcelona.  The qualification and final rounds took place on July 26, 28 and August 1 at the Palau d'Esports de Barcelona.

Results

Qualification

Ninety gymnasts competed in the balance beam event during the compulsory and optional rounds on July 26 and 28.  The eight highest scoring gymnasts advanced to the final on August 1.  Each country was limited to two competitors in the final.

Final

References
Official Olympic Report
www.gymnasticsresults.com

Women's balance beam
1992 in women's gymnastics
Women's events at the 1992 Summer Olympics